Harlan Baker is an American politician and playwright from Maine. Baker, a Democrat, served five terms in the Maine House of Representatives between 1979 and 1988. Baker is also an adjunct faculty member of the University of Southern Maine's theater department.

A labor advocate, Baker submitted a bill to create a state-owned bank during his time in the House of Representatives, saying that it would help the state's agricultural and fishing industries. He also sponsored a resolution urging the state retirement system reduce investments in South Africa, which at the time was ruled by the racist apartheid government.

Baker is a longtime member of the Democratic Socialists of America and was a delegate for Bernie Sanders at the 2016 Democratic National Convention.

See also
List of Democratic Socialists of America who have held office in the United States

References

Living people
Politicians from Portland, Maine
Democratic Party members of the Maine House of Representatives
University of Southern Maine faculty
1947 births
Democratic Socialists of America politicians from Maine
Jewish American state legislators in Maine
Maine socialists
21st-century American Jews